These are tiles about the characters of Nick Fury, Nick Fury Jr., Ultimate Nick Fury or any other alternative version of the character published by Marvel Comics.

Ongoing series
 Sgt. Fury and his Howling Commandos (1963)
 Nick Fury, Agent of S.H.I.E.L.D.
 Nick Fury, Agent of S.H.I.E.L.D. (1968)
 Nick Fury, Agent of S.H.I.E.L.D. (1989)
 Nick Fury's Howling Commandos (2005)
 Secret Warriors (2009)
 Nick Fury (2017)

Limited series
 Nick Fury vs. S.H.I.E.L.D. (1988)
 Fury of S.H.I.E.L.D. (1995)
 Fury/Agent 13 (1998)
 Fury (2001)
 Fury: Peacemaker (2006)
 The Incredible Hulk: The Fury Files (2008)
 Avengers 1959 (2011)
 Fury: My War Gone By (2012)
 Fury's Big Week (2012)

Annuals and specials
 Sgt. Fury and his Howling Commandos Special King Size Annual 1 (1965)
 Sgt. Fury and his Howling Commandos Special King-Size Special 2 (1966)
 Sgt. Fury and his Howling Commandos Special King-Size Special 3 (1967)
 Sgt. Fury and his Howling Commandos Special King-Size Special 4 (1968)
 Sgt. Fury and his Howling Commandos Special King-Size Special 5 (1969)
 Sgt. Fury and his Howling Commandos Special King-Size Special 6 (1970)
 Sgt. Fury and his Howling Commandos Special King-Size Special 7 (1971)
 Sgt. Fury and his Howling Commandos: Shotgun Opera (2009)

Graphic novels and one-shots
 Wolverine/Nick Fury
 The Scorpio Connection (1989)
 Bloody Choices (1991)
 Scorpio Rising (1994)
 Fury (1994)
 Fury/Black Widow: Death Duty (1995)
 Captain America and Nick Fury: Blood Truce (1995)
 Captain America and Nick Fury: The Otherworld War (2001)
 Nick Fury: Spies Like Us (2008)
 Fury: S.H.I.E.L.D. 50th Anniversary (2015)

Comic strips
 Nick Fury, Agent of S.H.I.E.L.D., a comic book strip that was published in black and white in the UK Hulk Comic (1979)

As a feature in an anthology comic
 Nick Fury, Agent of S.H.I.E.L.D. in Strange Tales (1965)

Other
 Punisher/Nick Fury: Rules of the Game, (solicited and made but never released)

Collected editions
 Marvel Masterworks: Sgt. Fury
 Vol. 1 collects Sgt. Fury and his Howling Commandos #1-13, 320 pages, February 2006, 
 Vol. 2 collects Sgt. Fury and his Howling Commandos #14-23 and Annual #1, 240 pages, June 2008, 
 Vol. 3 collects Sgt. Fury and his Howling Commandos #24-32 and Annual #2, 224 pages, August 2010, 
 Essential Sgt Fury Vol. 1 collects Sgt. Fury and his Howling Commandos #1-23 and Annual #1, 544 pages, November 2011, 
 Son of Origins of Marvel Comics includes Nick Fury, Agent of S.H.I.E.L.D. story from Strange Tales #135, 249 pages, October 1975, 
 Marvel Masterworks: Nick Fury, Agent of S.H.I.E.L.D.
 Vol. 1 collects Strange Tales #135-153, Tales of Suspense #78, and Fantastic Four #21, 288 pages, September 2007, 
 Vol. 2 collects Strange Tales #154-168 and Nick Fury, Agent of S.H.I.E.L.D. #1-3, 272 pages, December 2009, 
 Vol. 3 collects Nick Fury, Agent of S.H.I.E.L.D. #4-15, The Avengers #72, and Marvel Spotlight #31, 320 pages, December 2011, 
 S.H.I.E.L.D.: The Complete Collection Omnibus collects Strange Tales #135-168, Nick Fury, Agent of S.H.I.E.L.D. #1-15, Fantastic Four #21, Tales of Suspense #78, The Avengers #72, and Marvel Spotlight #31, 960 pages, October 2015, 
 Marvel Comics Presents: Nick Fury vs. S.H.I.E.L.D. collects Nick Fury vs. S.H.I.E.L.D. #1-6, 1989
 S.H.I.E.L.D.: Nick Fury vs. S.H.I.E.L.D. collects Nick Fury vs. S.H.I.E.L.D. #1-6, 304 pages, December 2011, 
 Nick Fury, Agent of S.H.I.E.L.D. Classic 
 Vol. 1 collects Nick Fury, Agent of S.H.I.E.L.D. vol. 3 #1-11, 272 pages, July 2012, 
 Vol. 2 collects Nick Fury, Agent of S.H.I.E.L.D. vol. 3 #12-23, 288 pages, February 2015, 
 Vol. 3 collects Nick Fury, Agent of S.H.I.E.L.D. vol. 3 #24-38, 288 pages, June 2015, 
 Secret Warriors Vol. 1: Nick Fury, Agent of Nothing collects Secret Warriors #1-6, 184 pages, September 2009,

See also
 Nick Fury, Agent of S.H.I.E.L.D.: Empyre, a 2000 prose novel by Will Murray
 S.H.I.E.L.D., the fictional Marvel Comics espionage agency
 List of S.H.I.E.L.D. members

References

External links
 Nick Fury comics at the Comic Book DB

 
Nick Fury
Nick Fury
Nick Fury